Nocturne of Love may refer to:

 Nocturne of Love (1919 film), a silent German film directed by Carl Boese
 Nocturne of Love (1948 film), a Mexican film directed by Emilio Gómez Muriel